Latin Quarter is a 1945 British thriller, which was directed by Vernon Sewell and stars Derrick De Marney, Joan Greenwood and Beresford Egan.  The film is an adaptation of the play L'Angoisse by Pierre Mills and C. Vylars.  It was Sewell's second film version of the story, following The Medium in 1934. It was made by British National Films at their studios in Elstree.

Plot
In the Paris of 1893, sculptor Charles Garrie (De Marney) enters into an illicit relationship with the married Christine Minetti (Greenwood).  Christine's husband Anton (Egan) is also a sculptor, and mentally unstable.  Anton finds out about Christine's affair and soon after she vanishes without trace.  Although the police consider Anton the prime suspect in being involved in his wife's disappearance, they can find no incriminating evidence, nor any lead as to her whereabouts, alive or dead.

Anton's mental deterioration gathers pace, and in due course he is arrested for the murder of his mistress and in this case there is no doubt of his guilt.  He still refuses however to give any indication of what happened to Christine.  Charles remains desperate to discover Christine's fate, and relates the whole story to a criminologist (Frederick Valk).  A psychic is called in and a séance is held in Anton's studio, revealing that Christine has always been much closer to home than anyone could have realised.

Cast
 Derrick De Marney as Charles Garrie
 Beresford Egan as Anton Minetti
 Joan Greenwood as Christine Minetti
 Frederick Valk as Dr. Ivan Krasner
 Sybille Binder as Mme. Cordova
 Joan Seton as Lucille Lindbeck
 Lily Kann as Maria
 Valentine Dyall as Prefect of Police
 Gerhard Kempinski as Sergeant
 Espinosa as Ballet Master
 Margaret Clarke as Ballet Mistress
 Bruce Winston as Jo-Jo
 Anthony Hawtrey as Specialist
 Martin Miller as Morgue keeper

References

External links 
 
 
 

1945 films
1940s historical thriller films
British historical thriller films
Films directed by Vernon Sewell
British black-and-white films
Films set in Paris
Films set in 1893
British films based on plays
Films shot at British National Studios
1940s English-language films
1940s British films